"Kuschel Song" is the debut single of German animated rabbit Schnuffel. Originally published by Jamba! as a ringtone, it was turned into a song by Sebastian Nussbaum and Andreas Marek-Wendorf. Released on 8 February 2008, "Kuschel Song" debuted at the top of the German Singles Chart, staying there for eight weeks, and was certified platinum by the Bundesverband Musikindustrie (BVMI) for 300,000 copies sold. After topping the Austrian Singles Chart and reaching number two in Switzerland, the song was released internationally. "Kuschel Song" was later included as the second track on Schnuffel's debut album, Ich hab' Dich lieb, released the same year.

A video of a person dressed as Schnuffel "singing" the song was created for the track. At the beginning of 2009, Schnuffel received a nomination for the single of the year at the 2008 Echo Music Awards. Later, in 2013, "Kuschel Song" was chosen by the German TV show Die ultimative Chart Show as the most successful jingle of the new millennium. The album Winterwunderland features an acoustic version of the song as the 14th track.

Track listings

 German CD1
 "Kuschel Song" (single version) – 2:50
 "Kuschel Song" (karaoke version) – 2:50

 German CD2
 "Kuschel Song" (single version) – 2:50
 "Snuggle Song" (English version) – 2:50

 German maxi-CD single
 "Kuschel Song" (single version) – 2:50
 "Kuschel Song" (karaoke version) – 2:50
 "Kuschel Song" (international version) – 2:50
 "Kuschel Song" (enhanced videoclip) – 2:50

Dutch CD single
 "Snuffie Song" (Nederlandse versie) – 2:50
 "Snuffie Song" (version Francaise) – 2:50
 "Snuffie Song" (English version) – 2:50

Portuguese CD single
 "Canção do orelhinhas" (versão portuguesa) – 2:50
 "Canção do orelhinhas" (versão karaoke) – 2:50
 "Canção do orelhinhas" (versão internacional) – 2:50
 "Canção do orelhinhas" (enhanced videoclip) – 2:50

Australian CD single
 "Snuggle Song" – 2:50
 "Snuggle Song" (video) – 2:50

Charts

Weekly charts

Year-end charts

Certifications and sales

Release history

References

2008 debut singles
2008 songs
Columbia Records singles
Number-one singles in Austria
Number-one singles in Germany
Schnuffel songs
Sony BMG singles